Becky Harris (born 1968) is the former chairwoman of the Nevada Gaming Control Board and a former state senator.

Biography
Harris was born in Provo, Utah. She graduated with a bachelor's degree from Brigham Young University in 1989, with a Juris Doctor from J. Reuben Clark Law School at BYU in 1992, with a master's degree from the University of Nevada, Las Vegas in 2000, and with a LL.M. in Gaming Law and Regulation from the William S. Boyd School of Law at the University of Nevada, Las Vegas in 2016. She is a Distinguished Fellow of Gaming and Leadership at the International Gaming Institute (IGI) at the University of Nevada, Las Vegas and she is a non-executive director on the board of PointsBet Holdings, an Australian and United States sportsbook operator. 

A former Democrat, Harris unsuccessfully ran for the Nevada Assembly in 2012, losing to Andy Eisen. She ran for the Senate in 2014, defeating incumbent Justin Jones.

Regarding her party switch, Harris said, "I just evolved and became very fiscally conservative as we began to employ people and take care of other people’s families and looked at what that cost in providing benefits for people and all that kind of thing.”

During the 2015 legislative session, Harris sponsored Senate Bill 262, which gives courts the ability to appoint a nonresident guardian for an adult or child ward. Previously state law required a co-guardian to be a resident of Nevada. The bill ignited the guardianship reform movement in Nevada and resulted in the creation of the Nevada Guardianship Commission along with additional reform legislation.

During the 2017 legislative session, Harris served on the Senate Judiciary, Finance and Education Committees.

Harris received the Nevada Chapter of the Community Associations Institute's Legislator of the Year in 2015, Nevada Association of School Boards' Executive Director's Award in 2015, and the National Education Association Republican Educators Caucus' Pacific Region Legislator of the Year in 2015.

In January 2018, Harris was named chair of the Nevada Gaming Control Board by Governor Brian Sandoval. She is the first woman to hold the position. Harris resigned from her state senate seat to accept the appointment.

Personal life
Harris and her husband, R. Garth Harris, have two children: Sydney and Mallory. She is a member of the Church of Jesus Christ of Latter-day Saints.

Electoral history

References

1968 births
Brigham Young University alumni
J. Reuben Clark Law School alumni
Latter Day Saints from Nevada
Living people
Republican Party Nevada state senators
Nevada Democrats
Politicians from Las Vegas
People from Provo, Utah
University of Nevada, Las Vegas alumni
Women state legislators in Nevada
21st-century American politicians
21st-century American women politicians
Members of American gaming commissions
Candidates in the 2012 United States elections
Candidates in the 2014 United States elections